The Springfield Pride football program represents Springfield College in college football at the NCAA Division III level. The Pride have competed as members of the New England Women's and Men's Athletic Conference (NEWMAC) since 2017, when the conference began sponsoring football. Springfield plays its home games at the Stagg Field in Springfield, Massachusetts. Stagg Field opened in 1971 as Benedum Field was renamed in 2007 in honor of Amos Alonzo Stagg, who initiated Springfield's football program in 1890 and was the team's first coach. Mike Cerasuolo has served as the team's head coach since 2016. Mike DeLong was the program's head coach from 1984 to 2015, compiling a record of 189–133–2. His 189 wins are the most of any head coach in program history.

Springfield's football program was a member of the Freedom Football Conference (FFC) from 1995 to 2003, the Empire 8 from 2004 to 2011, and the Liberty League from 2012 to 2016. The team has won eight conferences, five in the FFC, in 1996, 1998, 2000, 2002 and 2003, and one in the Empire 8, in 2006, under Delong. The Pride have won two NEWMAC championships, in 2017 and 2021, under Cerasuolo. Springfield has appeared in the NCAA Division III Football Championship playoffs seven times, in 1998, 2000, 2002, 2003, 2006, 2017, and 2021.

Springfield adopted the "Pride" nickname in 1996. They have previously been known as the Red and White, Gymnasts, Maroons, and Chiefs.

Playoff appearances

NCAA Division III

References

External links
 

 
American football teams established in 1890
1890 establishments in Massachusetts